

References

External links
-COPUR- Comité Olímpico de Puerto Rico Official site.